The Carnegie Hall Concerts: January 1946 is a live album by American pianist, composer and bandleader Duke Ellington recorded at Carnegie Hall, in New York City in 1946 and released on the Prestige label in 1977.

Reception
The AllMusic review by Scott Yanow awarded the album 3 stars and stated: "The 1946 concert is not as memorable as the others but the many major soloists still make this lesser item an enjoyable listening experience".

Track listing
All compositions by Duke Ellington except as indicated
 "Caravan" (Ellington, Irving Mills, Juan Tizol) - 3:45  
 "In a Mellow Tone" (Ellington, Milt Gabler) - 2:54  
 "Solid Old Man" - 3:35  
 "Spiritual (Come Sunday)/Work Song" - 12:06  
 "The Blues" - 5:08  
 "Rugged Romeo" - 3:09  
 "Sono" - 5:04  
 "Air-Conditioned Jungle" (Ellington, Jimmy Hamilton) - 5:45  
 "Pitter Panther Patter" - 2:14  
 "Take the "A" Train" (Billy Strayhorn) - 3:26  
 "Mellow Ditty" - 7:30  
 "Fugueaditty" - 2:40  
 "Jam-A-Ditty" - 3:34  
 "Magenta Haze" - 4:41  
 "Diminuendo in Blue/Transblucency" (Ellington/Ellington, Lawrence Brown) - 7:28  
 "Crescendo in Blue" - 3:40  
 "Suburbanite" - 4:32  
 "I'm Just a Lucky So and So" (Mack David, Ellington) - 4:32  
 "Riffin' Roll" - 2:26
Recorded at Carnegie Hall in New York on January 4, 1946.

Personnel
Duke Ellington – piano 
Cat Anderson, Shelton Hemphill, Taft Jordan, Francis Williams - trumpet
Lawrence Brown, Wilbur DeParis - trombone
Claude Jones - valve trombone
Jimmy Hamilton - tenor saxophone, clarinet 
Johnny Hodges - alto saxophone
Otto Hardwick - clarinet, alto saxophone
Al Sears - tenor saxophone
Harry Carney - baritone saxophone, clarinet, alto saxophone
Fred Guy - guitar
Oscar Pettiford, Al Lucas - bass
Sonny Greer - drums
Joya Sherrill (track 5), Kay Davis (track 15), Al Hibbler (track 18) - vocals

References

Duke Ellington live albums
1977 live albums
Live orchestral jazz albums
Prestige Records live albums
Albums recorded at Carnegie Hall